The Chemical Monitoring and Management Module is part of the New South Wales, Higher School Certificate (HSC) Chemistry course studied by Secondary Students in their final year of schooling (Year 12).  Students study four modules, 3 compulsory, and 1 of the 5 elective modules.

The 3 compulsory modules are:

Identification and Production of Materials
The Acidic Environment
Chemical Monitoring and Management

The five option modules, of which one may be studied are:

Industrial Chemistry
Shipwrecks and Salvage
Forensic Chemistry
The Biochemistry of Movement
The Chemistry of Art

The module "Chemical Monitoring and Management" is designed to teach students studying Chemistry:

The Role of Chemists in Monitoring and Management of Chemical Reactions
Various Methods of Chemical Analysis
The Production of Ammonia (The Haber/Bosch Process)
Chemical Equilibrium
Le Chatelier's Principle
The role of Catalysts
Identification of chemicals using chemical tests and Spectroscopy
The Chemical Monitoring and Management of the atmosphere and waterways

The syllabus was created by the New South Wales Board of Studies.

References 

Chemistry education